The Ducati Forza is a  single cylinder bevel drive SOHC motorcycle produced by the Spanish manufacturer MotoTrans, who were licensed by Ducati to produce motorcycles under the Ducati brand name and was produced from 1976 to 1983. The model is based on the 350 'wide case' Ducati singles which the Italian Ducati factory had stopped manufacturing in 1974, but which MotoTrans continued to develop and produce.

Model history
A prototype was shown at the 1974 Automobile Barcelona Show.

1st series
Production started in 1976 and ran to 1979. The model was fitted with a disc front brake. Electrics were uprated to 12v and an electric starter fitted. The machine was finished in metallic red with chrome headlight and mudguards.

2nd series
The model was updated in 1980 with cast wheels and a rear disc brake. The starter was moved from in front of the engine to behind the cylinders. The machine was finished in orange and the engine finished in black.

Technical details

Engine and transmission
The single cylinder bevel drive OHC engine was of unit construction and had an alloy head and alloy barrel with cast iron liners. A 9:1 piston was fitted.

Fuel was delivered by a Dell'Orto PHF 30 AS carburettor. The engine used wet sump lubrication and ignition was by battery and coil.

Primary drive was by gears to a multi-plate wet clutch and 5 speed gearbox. Chain drive took power to the rear wheel.

Cycle parts
The single cradle frame used the engine as a stressed member. Rear suspension was by swinging arm with twin adjustable Telesco Hydrobag gas shock absorbers. At the front Telesco telescopic forks were fitted. A Brembo  diameter disc brake was fitted on the front. Series 1 models had a   diameter rear drum. A rear disc brake was fitted on the 2nd series.

Tyres were 325x18 front and 350x18 rear, fitted to spoked wheels on series 1 models and cast wheels on series 2.

300 Forza
Some 1976 models were fitted with a nominal 300 cc engine. This model was also known as the 300 Electronic.

References

Bibliography

External links
  (series 1)
  (series 2)

Ducati motorcycles
Standard motorcycles
Motorcycles introduced in 1976
Single-cylinder motorcycles